Woodlands Rugby Club is an amateur rugby team that plays in the ILT Southland Wide Premier Division.  The team has many Stags stars such as Robbie Robinson, Joe Tuineau and Pehi Te Whare. The team includes Jimmy Cowan and Jamie Mackintosh. Peni Ravai from the Flying Fijians is a new inclusion. Ravai plays Prop/Hooker and was part of the World Cup Fijian Team 2015.

References
Southland Rugby Clubs Page
http://www.rugbysouthland.co.nz/index.php?pageLoad=28&par=7

New Zealand rugby union teams
Sport in Southland, New Zealand